The Skalica Formation is a geologic formation in Austria. It preserves fossils dating back to the Serravallian stage (Sarmatian) of the Miocene period.

See also 
 List of fossiliferous stratigraphic units in Austria

References

Further reading 
 M. Harzhauser and W. E. Piller. 2010. Molluscs as a major part of subtropical shallow-water carbonate production - an example from a Middle Miocene oolite shoal (Upper Serravallian, Austria). In M. Mutti, W. E. Piller, C. Betzler (eds.), Carbonate Systems during the Oligocene-Miocene climatic transition. International Association of Sedimentologists Special Publication 42:183-200

Geologic formations of Austria
Miocene Series of Europe
Neogene Austria
Serravallian
Sandstone formations
Shallow marine deposits
Paleontology in Austria